The XI (11th) Corps (camouflage names of the 465th Army or the 630th United Nations Corps), are a corps of the Korean People's Army and are the headquarters of all special forces. It is known that its headquarters are based in Tokchon.

The 17th Reconnaissance Brigade merged with the 124th Army and 283th Army of the National Security Agency's Reconnaissance Division, which were founded in early October and 16th of 1967, respectively, to form the "Special Eighth Army" in January 1969. In July 1983, it was changed to the Ministry of General Affairs' Office of the Ministry of Servitude and Guidance (English: Light Infantry Guide Bureau), and in 1991 it was reorganized into the 11th Corps.

On December 14, 2011, Senior Research Fellow Jeong Seong-jung of the Sejong Institute announced that Choi Kyung-sung had discovered that the commander of the army was a legionary.

In 2020, members of the Corps were sent to the Sino-DPRK border area of Ryanggang Province to combat smuggling and other "anti-state" activities.

Known units
16th Sniper Brigade
38th Aviation Army Brigade in Sangwon County, Pyongyang
43rd Mountain Army Infantry Sniper Brigade-5 battalions, Kapsan County, Hyesan, Ryanggang-do
Unit 124, a special operations unit that was involved in the 1968 Blue House raid

References

Corps of North Korea